The 2018 Montana Grizzlies football team represented the University of Montana in the 2018 NCAA Division I FCS football season. The Grizzlies were led by first-year coach Bobby Hauck, 8th overall as he previously was head coach from 2003–2009, and played their home games on campus at Washington–Grizzly Stadium in Missoula, Montana as a charter member of the Big Sky Conference. They finished the season 6–5, 4–4 in Big Sky play to finish in a tie for sixth place.

Previous season 
The Griz finished the 2017 season 7–4, 5–3 in Big Sky play to finish in a tie for sixth place.

On November 20, it was announced that head coach Bob Stitt's contract would not be renewed. He finished at Montana with a three-year record of 21–14.

Preseason

Polls
On July 16, 2018 during the Big Sky Kickoff in Spokane, Washington, the Grizzlies were predicted to finish in seventh place in the coaches poll and fourth place in the media poll.

Preseason All-Conference Team
The Grizzlies had one player selected to the Preseason All-Conference Team.

Josh Buss – Sr. LB. Also selected as the preseason defensive player of the year.

Award watch lists
Listed in the order that they were released

Schedule

Source: Official Schedule

Game summaries

Northern Iowa

Drake

at Western Illinois

Sacramento State

at Cal Poly

Portland State

at North Dakota

UC Davis

at Southern Utah

at Idaho

Montana State

Ranking movements

References

Montana
Montana Grizzlies football seasons
Montana Grizzlies football